Sooryaputhran is a 1998 Indian Malayalam action comedy-drama film, directed by Thulasidas, starring Jayaram and Divya Unni in the lead roles.

Plot
Jeevan is an orphan, and a self-made estate owner in Ooty. He aspires to have a family for himself and decides to adopt a child, however the Father who runs the orphanage is against giving the child to a bachelor. His friend Shatrughnan lies to Father about Jeevan having a wife, whom Father demands to see. In an unexpected turn of events, they encounter Hema who agrees to act as his wife. Rest of the story captures the mystery behind Hema and their life.

Cast

Soundtrack 
The film's soundtrack contains 7 songs, all composed by Ouseppachan, with lyrics by S. Ramesan Nair.

References

External links

1998 films
1990s Malayalam-language films
Films directed by Thulasidas
Films scored by Ouseppachan